School segregation is the division of people into different groups in the education system by characteristics such as race, religion, or ethnicity.

See also
D.H. and Others v. the Czech Republic
School segregation in the United States
Single-sex education

References

Segregation
Education issues